Samuel Seewald (1997–2020) was shot dead in Amsterdam by police officers on August 13, 2020. He was known as Sammy Baker on Instagram where he had 170,000 followers. Seewald has travelled to Amsterdam to celebrate his birthday with friends. After smoking cannabis with friends, he became psychotic. His mother travelled to meet him and he ran away, before being shot by police in controversial circumstances. The Amsterdam chief of police claimed he had stabbed an officer whilst his parents claimed he was the victim of a racist murder.

Killing
Samuel Seewald was born to parents Justine and Kai in 1997 and grew up in Germany. He developed interests in sports and music, becoming a bodybuilder in his teens. He started an Instagram account under the name Sammy Baker which grew to have 170,000 followers. Seewald had been visiting Amsterdam to celebrate his birthday when he disappeared on August 11. It was later assumed that he had legally smoked cannabis with two friends and had become psychotic. He acted in a paranoid manner and lost contact with his friends.

His mother was concerned about his welfare and travelled from Wetzlar in Germany to Amsterdam. She managed to locate him in the borough of Amsterdam Nieuw-West and after a discussion which occurred in her car, he ran away. She asked a passing policeman for help and her son ran away again. Seewald ended up in a small park surrounded by residential buildings at the Honselersdijkstraat. There was a tense discussion between Seewald and police officers that lasted around 15 minutes. It was observed by a journalist who happened to be looking out of their window. The journalist stated Seewald was dressed in boxer shorts and a T-shirt, and was holding an object to his neck.

As his mother stood nearby, an ambulance with mental health workers arrived but they stayed behind the police who had their guns drawn. Seewald allegedly held a knife to his throat and when a police officer approached from behind him with a police dog, he turned round and there was a struggle. Seewald was then shot three times and taken to hospital where he died of his injuries. The Dutch media reported the claims of the Amsterdam police chief, Frank Paauw, that Seewald had attacked a police officer with the knife. Witnesses to the killing were not interviewed and the police bodycam footage was found to be defective.

Aftermath
In the aftermath, Seewald's father commented "What I think: The Amsterdam police murdered my son". The parents publicly questioned the police narrative, asking why Seewald had been shot and if there was a racist motive. Elnathan Prinsen of the Dutch Association for Psychiatry commented that the police had not behaved in a manner which could have de-escalated the situation.

In 2021, hundreds of people attended a demonstration in Amsterdam marking one year since the killing. The parents of Seewald made a complaint against Frank Paauw because he had refused to apologise for his statements about how Seewald had attacked a police officer with a knife. There was no damage to the officer's jacket, a fact which was confirmed by two investigations by the National Criminal Investigation Department. In 2022, Paauw appeared in front of the National Police Complaints Commission. The family demanded that he resigned; the commission upheld the complaint and Paauw said his comments should have been more reserved. Seewald's parents announced in June 2022 that they would consider further legal action pending the outcome of an independent investigation.

See also 
 Killing of Michael Koomen
 Killing of Mitch Henriquez

References 

1997 births
2020 deaths
2020 in the Netherlands
People killed by law enforcement officers
Celebrities in popular culture